Alvaro Eduardo Roca Despeyroux (born 16 October 1939) is a Uruguayan basketball player. He competed in the men's tournament at the 1964 Summer Olympics.

References

External links
 

1939 births
Living people
Uruguayan men's basketball players
1959 FIBA World Championship players
1963 FIBA World Championship players
Olympic basketball players of Uruguay
Basketball players at the 1964 Summer Olympics
Place of birth missing (living people)